Van der Zouwen is a Dutch surname. Notable people with the surname include:

 Arie van der Zouwen, Dutch footballer and manager 
 Hans van der Zouwen (born 1939), Dutch sociologist

Dutch-language surnames